Lalekan (also Romanized as Lālekān, Lālakān, and Lālkān; also known as Lālehkhan and Lāyekān) is a village in Khoshkrud Rural District, in the Central District of Zarandieh County, Markazi Province, Iran. At the 2006 census, its population was 26, in 11 families.

References 

Populated places in Zarandieh County